Ya or Ja (Я я; italics: Я я) is a letter of the Cyrillic script, the civil script variant of Old Cyrillic Little Yus or maybe even 'Ꙗ'.  Among modern Slavic languages, it is used in the East Slavic languages and Bulgarian. It is also used in the Cyrillic alphabets used by Mongolian and many Uralic, Caucasian and Turkic languages of the former Soviet Union.

Pronunciation

When  follows a soft consonant, no  sound occurs between the consonant and the vowel.

The exact pronunciation of the vowel sound of  depends also on the following sound by allophony in the Slavic languages. If a hard consonant follows  or none, the result is an open vowel, usually [].

In non-stressed positions, the vowel reduction depends on the language and the dialect. The standard Russian language reduces the vowel to [], but yakanye dialects  undergo no reduction unlike other instances of the  phoneme (represented with the letter ).

History 

The letter , known as little jus (yus) originally stood for a front nasal vowel, conventionally transcribed as ę. The history of the letter (in both Church Slavonic and vernacular texts) varies according to the development of this sound in the different areas where Cyrillic was used.

In Serbia, [ę] became [e] at a very early period and the letter  ceased to be used, being replaced by e. The letter continued to be used, but its distribution, particularly in regard to the other jusy, was governed as much by orthographical convention as by phonetic value or etymology.

Among the Eastern Slavs, [ę] was denasalised, probably to [æ], which palatalised the preceding consonant; after palatalisation became phonemic, the /æ/ phoneme merged with /a/, and ѧ henceforth indicated /a/ after a palatalised consonant, or else, in initial or post-vocalic position, /ja/. However, Cyrillic already had a character with this function, namely , so that for the Eastern Slavs these two characters were henceforth equivalent. The alphabet in Meletij Smotrickij's grammar of 1619 accordingly lists "" ("ꙗ ili ѧ", "ꙗ or ѧ"); he explains that  is used initially and  elsewhere. (In fact he also distinguishes the feminine form of the accusative plural of the third person pronoun  from the masculine and neuter .) This reflects the practice of earlier scribes and was further codified by the Muscovite printers of the seventeenth century (and is continued in modern Church Slavonic). However, in vernacular and informal writing of the period, the two letters may be used completely indiscriminately.

It was similarly adopted for the standardised orthographies of modern Ukrainian and Belarusian.

Use in loanwords and transcriptions 
In Russian, the letter has little use in loanwords and orthographic transcriptions of foreign words.

Nonetheless,  is used for Estonian and Finnish  – for instance, Pärnu is written  in Russian, although the Russian pronunciation does not match the original.

Related letters and other similar characters
Ѧ ѧ: Cyrillic letter Little Yus
: Cyrillic letter Iotated A
ᴙ : Latin letter small capital reversed R, used informally in phonetics to represent the epiglottal trill (see IPA consonants)
Â â: Latin letter Â - a Romanian and Vietnamese letter
R r: Latin letter R

Computing codes
Unicode provides separate code-points for the Old Cyrillic and civil script forms of this letter.  A number of Old Cyrillic fonts developed before the publication of Unicode 5.1 placed Iotified A at the code points for Ya (Я/я) instead of the Private Use Area, but since Unicode 5.1, Iotified A has been encoded separately from Ya .

See also
Faux Cyrillic

References

External links